Nimioglossa ravida is a species of bristle fly in the family Tachinidae. It is found in North America.

Distribution
Mexico, United States.

References

Dexiinae
Insects described in 1945
Diptera of North America